Bradley Grayson (born 2 January 1994) is an English professional footballer who plays as a forward for Ossett United.

Coming through the youth academy at Doncaster Rovers, Grayson notably played as a professional in Sweden, Philippines and Australia for Ånge IF, Loyola Meralco Sparks and Cumberland United. The rest of his career has been spent playing semi-professionally in England's non-league system with Frickley Athletic, Matlock Town, Goole, Stocksbridge Park Steels, Buxton, Mickleover Sports, Stafford Rangers, Grantham Town and Gainsborough Trinity.

Career
Grayson made his debut for Doncaster Rovers in August 2010, coming on in the 90th minute in his side's 2–1 loss after extra time to Accrington Stanley in the League Cup. He later went on to make the bench three times that season.

After being released by Doncaster in 2011, Grayson went on to play for Frickley Athletic as well as having spells at Matlock Town, Stocksbridge Park Steels and Mickleover Sports as well as playing in Sweden for Ånge, in Australia for Cumberland United and in the Philippines for Loyola Meralco Sparks. Joining Filipino club Loyola Meralco Sparks in the summer 2015, he left the club again in September 2015 to return to Stocksbridge Park Steels. He left the club a few weeks later and then joined another of his former clubs, Frickley Athletic.

In September 2017, Grayson began a job as a cover supervisor  in Doncaster.

In January 2018, Grayson returned to Buxton for the second time. He went on a one-month loan at Stafford Rangers on 12 October 2019 and the deal was then made permanent at the end of the spell in November 2019 after scoring five goals in his six appearances for the club on loan.

In July 2020, Grayson rejoined Frickley Athletic for the fourth time, scoring on his first start of the season in the F.A. Cup against Newcastle Benfield. In June 2021, Grayson decided to leave the club once again.

He signed for Northern Premier League Premier League side Gainsborough Trinity on a free transfer in September 2021.

Grayson was not retained by Trinity at the end of the season. Trinity initially did a u-turn and re-signed Grayson for the 2022–23 season, however on 13 September 2022 he signed for Ossett United.

References

External links

Swedish football stats

1993 births
Living people
English footballers
English expatriate footballers
Footballers from Doncaster
Association football forwards
Doncaster Rovers F.C. players
Frickley Athletic F.C. players
Matlock Town F.C. players
Ånge IF players
Cumberland United FC players
Goole A.F.C. players
Stocksbridge Park Steels F.C. players
F.C. Meralco Manila players
Buxton F.C. players
Mickleover Sports F.C. players
Stafford Rangers F.C. players
Grantham Town F.C. players
Gainsborough Trinity F.C. players
Ossett United F.C. players
English expatriate sportspeople in Sweden
English expatriate sportspeople in Australia
English expatriate sportspeople in the Philippines
Expatriate footballers in Sweden
Expatriate soccer players in Australia
Expatriate footballers in the Philippines
Schoolteachers from Yorkshire
Division 5 (Swedish football) players